The Helios 2 system, which consists of the Helios 2A and Helios 2B, is a French-developed military Earth observation satellite program. Financed at 90% by France, the development also involved minor participation from Belgium, Spain, Italy and Greece. Helios 2A was launched on December 18, 2004, by an Ariane 5 rocket from French Guiana.

Helios 2B  was launched five years later on December 18, 2009, carried also by an Ariane 5. The two satellites are identical. They carry a Thales-built high-resolution visible and thermal infrared instrument with 35 cm resolution, and an Airbus-built medium-resolution instrument. The Helios 2 satellite bus is nearly identical to the platform built by EADS Astrium for the Spot 5 civil-commercial optical observation satellite.

The Helios 2 will be replaced by the Composante Spatiale Optique (CSO), a new French program of three military observation satellites. The first satellite (CSO-1) was launched on December 19, 2018, the second (CSO-2) on December 29, 2020, with the final launch (CSO-3) being scheduled for 2022.

See also

 Hélios 1, the previous generation
 CSO, the follow-on system

References
https://helios.cnes.fr/en/helios-0

External links

Reconnaissance satellites of France
Satellites of Spain
Satellites of Italy
Spacecraft launched in 2004
Spacecraft launched in 2009
Spacecraft launched by Ariane rockets
Military equipment introduced in the 2000s